Croisette is a commune in the Pas-de-Calais department in the Hauts-de-France region of France.

Geography
Croisette is located 24 miles (37 km) west of Arras at the junction of the D101 and D104 roads.

Population
The inhabitants are called Croisettois.

Places of interest
 The church of St. Martin, dating from the seventeenth century
 The single Commonwealth War Graves Commission grave and monument
 Remains of a fortified house
 Two chapels

See also
 Communes of the Pas-de-Calais department

References

External links

 The Commonwealth War Graves Commission grave of Lt. Donald Ashworth Creaton

Communes of Pas-de-Calais